The Alcmaeonidae  or Alcmaeonids  were a wealthy and powerful noble family of ancient Athens, a branch of the Neleides who claimed descent from the mythological Alcmaeon, the great-grandson of Nestor.

In the 7th through 5th centuries BC, the Alcmaeonidae played a significant role in the developments and events that occurred in Athens. Such developments included overthrowing an Athenian tyrant, helping to lay the foundations of Athenian democracy, and having generals for Athens during the Peloponnesian War. The Alcmaeonidae were mentioned frequently throughout Herodotus' The Histories, and many played a key role in shaping Athens. The first prominent Alcmaeonid was Megacles, who was exiled from the city and given a curse on him and his family. Furthermore, there was Cleisthenes, who became known as "the father of Athenian democracy" by numerous scholars and historians. Another famous Alcmaeonid was Pericles, whom Thucydides would later call "the first citizen of Athens," as well as Alcibiades, who switched sides numerous times during the Peloponnesian War, and would end up being the last of the notable Alcmaeonidae. The main aristocratic rival of the Alcmaeonidae in the 6th and 5th centuries BC were the Peisistratids.

Early background and history 
Unlike many aristocratic families at the time, the Alcmaeonidae were not named after a mythological founder, but rather from an historical figure. In this case, the founder was Alcmaeon, father of Megacles. Similar to other aristocratic families however, was that the Alcmaeonidae did employ the tradition of reusing the name of the maternal or paternal grandfather in the family. As a result, there are numerous Megacles, Alcmaeon, and Cleisthenes names in this family. The first noteworthy Alcmaeonid was Megacles, son of Alcmaeon, who was the Archon Eponymous of Athens in the 7th century BC. He was responsible for killing the followers of Cylon of Athens during the attempted coup in 632 BC, as Cylon had taken refuge as a suppliant at the temple of Athena, even though Megacles had promised their safety. In essence, he went against his word. As a result of their actions, Megacles and his Alcmaeonid followers were the subject of an ongoing curse and were exiled from the city. Even the bodies of buried Alcmaeonidae were dug up and removed from the city limits.

Alcmaeonids were allowed back into the city in 594 BC, during the archonship of Solon, and were able to recover significant influence. During the tyranny of Pisistratus, a member of the influential Peisistratids family and rival clan to the Alcmaeonidae, the aforementioned Megacles married his daughter to the tyrant, but when the tyrant refused to have children with her, Megacles and his allies banished him. Later the Alcmaeonids would claim to have been exiled following Pisistratus' return in 546 BC, so as to distance themselves from possible accusations of complicity, but epigraphic evidence in fact proves that Cleisthenes was archon for the year 525–24 BC. Megacles was able to marry (for a second or third time) Agarista, the daughter of the tyrant Cleisthenes of Sicyon. They had two sons, Hippocrates and another Cleisthenes, this one the reformer of Athenian democracy. Hippocrates' daughter was Agariste, the mother of Pericles.

Contributions to Athenian democracy: Cleisthenes 

The Alcmaeonid Cleisthenes overthrew Hippias, the son and successor of Pisistratus, in 508 BC. Herodotus claimed in his The Histories that the Alcmaeonidae specifically hated tyranny, and that they were more esteemed and highly honored than any other clan for ridding Athens from it. Cleisthenes had bribed the oracle at Delphi (which the Alcmaeonidae had helped to build while they were in exile) to convince the Spartans to help him, which they reluctantly did. He was, at first, opposed by some who felt the famous curse made the Alcmaeonidae ineligible to rule; the Spartan king Cleomenes I even turned against Cleisthenes and the latter was briefly exiled once more. However, the citizens called for Cleisthenes to return, as Cleisthenes achieved support from the masses due to his calls for a more democratic system against his rival Isagoras, thus giving more power to the people, and the restored Alcmaeonids were responsible for laying the foundations of Athenian democracy.

A few of the contributions that the Alcmaeonid Cleisthenes helped develop in Athens included the shifting of political organization from the four traditional tribes, which were based on family relations and which formed the basis of the upper class Athenian political power network, into ten tribes according to their area of residence (their deme), which would form the basis of a new democratic power structure. Additionally, through Cleisthenes' reforms, the people of Athens endowed their city with isonomic institutions—equal rights for all citizens (though only men were citizens)—and established ostracism as a punishment. He also established sortition—the random selection of citizens to fill government positions rather than kinship or heredity, a true test of real democracy. He reorganized the Boule, created with 400 members under Solon, so that it had 500 members, 50 from each tribe. He also introduced the bouletic oath, "To advise according to the laws what was best for the people".

Later years: Pericles and Alcibiades 
The Alcmaeonidae were said to have negotiated for an alliance with the Persians during the Persian Wars, despite the fact that Athens was leading the resistance to the Persian invasion. In Herodotus' The Histories, the Alcmaeonidae were accused of sending a shield as a warning signal for the Persians, something that Herodotus, in his opinion, refused to believe that the Alcmaeonidae could be traitors to Athens. In addition, many scholars have debated over the veracity of the story of the shield signal, some believing that it was a ploy to slander the Alcmaeonidae, others that it was just a tale that had gained traction and had no truth.

Pericles and Alcibiades also belonged to the Alcmaeonidae, and during the Peloponnesian War the Spartans referred to the family's curse in an attempt to discredit Pericles. Pericles led Athens from roughly 461 to 429 BC, in what is sometimes referred to as the "Age of Pericles." He is credited in part for the transformation of Athens into an empire through the Delian League. Pericles promoted the arts and literature, and it is principally through his efforts that Athens acquired the reputation of being the educational and cultural center of the ancient Greek world. He started an ambitious project that generated most of the surviving structures on the Acropolis, including the Parthenon. This project beautified and protected the city, exhibited its glory, and gave work to its people. Pericles' Funeral Oration is nowadays synonymous with the struggle for participatory democracy and civic pride. He eventually would succumb to the Plague of Athens that ran rampant during this time, killing numerous people.

Alcibiades was a prominent orator, general, and statesmen of Athens as well; however, he would end up switching sides from Athens to Sparta during the Peloponnesian War several times. He was an aggressive advocate for the Sicilian Expedition for Athens, but eventually fled to Sparta after accusation of sacrilege. According to some scholars, Alcibiades was an invincible general and wherever he went, victory would follow him; had he led the army in Sicily, the Athenians would have avoided disaster and, had his countrymen followed his advice at Aegospotami, Lysander would have lost and Athens would have ruled Greece. Alcibiades also tried to ally with the Persians after he was accused of impiety, but Thucydides claims this was due to him wanting to be restored in Athens by the Persians, ultimately failing to achieve his goal. The family would eventually disappear from prominence after Athens's defeat in the Peloponnesian War.

Family tree
As a result of a family tradition for naming descendants after their forebears, members of the family can easily be confused. Hence, what follows is a partial family tree of the historical Alcmaeonid family. Males are in blue, females in red, and those related by marriage in white.

Notes

References

Other sources

 
Ancient Athenian families
Medism